Hulemacanthus is a genus of flowering plants belonging to the family Acanthaceae.

Its native range is New Guinea.

Species:

Hulemacanthus novoguineensis 
Hulemacanthus whitei

References

Acanthaceae
Acanthaceae genera